Cnemaspis is a genus of diurnal (day) geckos found in Asia. With over 100 species, it is one of the most diverse genera of geckos. Molecular phylogenies suggest that the two regional groupings may form distinct clades which are not each other's closest relatives.

Description
Species in this genus have slender, clawed digits which are cylindrical or depressed at the base (rarely dilated); the distal phalanges are compressed, forming an angle with the basal portion of the digits, the lower surface of which has a row of plates. Their bodies are more or less depressed, granular or tubercular above. Tail not compressed. Pupil circular; eyelid distinct all round the eye. Males with or without pre-anal or femoral pores.

Species

The Indian Subcontinent and Sri Lanka group

C. aaronbaueri Sayyed, Grismer, Campbell & Dileepkumar, 2019 
C. adii C. Srinivasulu, Kumar & B. Srinivasulu, 2015 – Adi's day gecko
C. agarwali Khandekar, 2019 – Agarwal's dwarf gecko 
C. agayagangai Agarwal, Thackeray, & Khandekar, 2022 – Agaya Gangai dwarf gecko 
C. ajijae Sayyed, Pyron & Dileepkumar, 2018 – Ajija's day gecko
C. alwisi Wickramasinghe & Munindradasa, 2007 – Alwis's day gecko
C. amba Khandekar, Thackeray & Agarwal, 2019 – Amba dwarf gecko 
C. amboliensis Sayyed, Pyron & Dileepkumar, 2018 – Amboli day gecko
C. amith Manamendra-Arachchi, Batuwita & Pethiyagoda, 2007 – Amith's day gecko
C. anamudiensis Cyriac, Johny, Umesh & Palot, 2018 
C. anandani Murthy, Nitesh, Sengupta & Deepak, 2019 – Anandan's day gecko 
C. andersonii (Annandale, 1905) 
C. anslemi Karunarathna & Ukuwela, 2019
C. assamensis Das & Sengupta, 2000 – Assam day gecko
C. australis Manamendra-Arachchi, Batuwita & Pethiyagoda, 2007 – southern day gecko
C. avasabinae Agarwal, Bauer & Khandekar, 2020 – Sabin's Nellore dwarf gecko
C. azhagu Khandekar, Thackeray, & Agarwal, 2022
C. balerion Pal, Mirza, Dsouza & Shanker, 2021
C. beddomei (Theobald, 1876) – Beddome's day gecko
C. boiei (Gray, 1876) – Boie's day gecko
C. butewai Karunarathna et al., 2019 – Butewe's day gecko
C. chengodumalaensis Cyriac, Palot, Deuti & Umesh, 2020
C. dissanayakai Karunarathna et al., 2019 – Dissanayaka's day gecko
C. fantastica Agarwal, Thackeray, & Khandekar, 2022 – fantastic dwarf gecko
C. flaviventralis  Sayyed, Pyron & Dahanukar, 2016  – yellow-bellied day gecko
C. galaxia Pal, Mirza, Dsouza & Shanker, 2021
C. gemunu de Silva, Greenbaum & Jackman, 2007 
C. girii Mirza, Pal, Bhosale & Sanap, 2014 – Giri's day gecko
C. goaensis Sharma, 1976 – Goan day gecko
C. godagedarai de Silva, Bauer, Botejue & Karunarathna, 2019 – Godagedara's day gecko
C. gotaimbarai Karunarathna et al., 2019 – Gotaimbara's day gecko
C. gracilis (Beddome, 1870) – graceful day gecko
C. graniticola Agarwal, Thackeray, Pal & Khandekar, 2020 – granite dwarf gecko
C. gunasekarai Amarasinghe, Karunarathna, Madawala & de Silva, 2021
C. gunawardanai Amarasinghe, Karunarathna, Madawala & de Silva, 2021
C. heteropholis Bauer, 2002 – Gund day gecko, different-scaled day gecko
C. hitihamii Karunarathna et al., 2019 – Hitihami's day gecko
C. indica Gray, 1846 – Indian day gecko, Nilgiri dwarf gecko
C. ingerorum Batuwita, Agarwal & Bauer, 2019
C. jackieii Pal, Mirza, Dsouza & Shanker, 2021
C. jerdonii (Theobald, 1868) – Jerdon's day gecko
C. kalakadensis Khandekar, Thackeray, & Agarwal, 2022
C. kallima Manamendra-Arachchi, Batuwita & Pethiyagoda, 2007 
C. kandambyi Batuwita & Udugampala, 2017
C. kandiana (Kelaart, 1852), Kandyan day gecko
C. kawminiae Karunarathna et al., 2019 – Kawmini's day gecko
C. kivulegedarai Karunarathna et al., 2019 – Kivulegedara's day gecko
C. kohukumburai Karunarathna et al., 2019 – Kohukumbura's day gecko
C. kolhapurensis Giri, Bauer & Gaikwad, 2009  – Kolhapur day gecko
C. kotagamai Karunarathna et al., 2019) – Kotagama's day gecko
C. kottiyoorensis Cyriac & Umesh, 2014 – Kottiyoor day gecko
C. koynaensis Khandekar, Thackeray & Agarwal, 2019 – Koyna dwarf gecko
C. krishnagiriensis Agarwal, Thackeray & Khandekar, 2021 – Krishnagiri dwarf gecko 
C. kumarasinghei Wickramasinghe & Munindradasa, 2007 – Kumarasinghe's day gecko
C. latha Manamendra-Arachchi, Batuwita & Pethiyagoda, 2007 – Latha's day gecko
C. limayei Sayyed, Pyron & Dileepkumar, 2018 – Limaye's day gecko
C. lithophilis Pal, Mirza, Dsouza & Shanker, 2021
C. littoralis (Jerdon, 1854) – coastal day gecko
C. lokugei Karunarathna et al., 2021 – Lokuge's day gecko
C. maculicollis Cyriac, Johny, Umesh & Palot, 2018 
C. magnifica Khandekar, Thackeray, Pal & Agarwal, 2020 – Magnificent dwarf gecko
C. mahabali Sayyed, Pyron & Dileepkumar, 2018 – Mahabal's day gecko
C. manoae Amarasinghe & Karunarathna, 2020 – Mano's day gecko
C. menikay Manamendra-Arachchi, Batuwita & Pethiyagoda, 2007
C. molligodai Wickramasinghe & Munindradasa, 2007 – Molligoda's day gecko
C. monticola Manamendra-Arachchi, Batuwita & Pethiyagoda, 2007 
C. mundanthuraiensis Khandekar, Thackeray, & Agarwal, 2022
C. mysoriensis  (Jerdon, 1853) – Mysore day gecko
C. nairi Inger, Marx & Koshy, 1984 – Ponmudi day gecko
C. nandimithrai Karunarathna et al., 2019 – Nandimithra's day gecko
C. nicobaricus Chandramouli, 2020
C. nigriventris Pal, Mirza, Dsouza & Shanker, 2021
C. nilagirica Manamendra-Arachchi, Batuwita & Pethiyagoda, 2007 – Nilgiri day gecko
C. nilgala  Karunarathna, Bauer, de Silva, Surasinghe, Somaratna, Madawala, Gabadage, Botejue, Henkanaththegedara & Ukuwela, 2019 – Nilgala day gecko
C. nimbus Pal, Mirza, Dsouza & Shanker, 2021
C. ornata (Beddome, 1870) – ornate day gecko
C. pachaimalaiensis Agarwal, Thackeray, & Khandekar, 2022 – Pachaimalai dwarf gecko
C. palakkadensis Sayyed, Cyriac & Dileepkumar, 2020 – Palakkad dwarf gecko
C. palanica Pal, Mirza, Dsouza & Shanker, 2021
C. pava Manamendra-Arachchi, Batuwita & Pethiyagoda, 2007
C. phillipsi Manamendra-Arachchi, Batuwita & Pethiyagoda, 2007 – Phillip's day gecko
C. podihuna Deraniyagala, 1944 – Deraniyagala's gecko
C. pulchra Manamendra-Arachchi, Batuwita & Pethiyagoda, 2007
C. punctata Manamendra-Arachchi, Batuwita & Pethiyagoda, 2007
C. rajakarunai Wickramasinghe, Vidanapathirana & Rathnayake, 2016 
C. rajgadensis Sayyed, Cyriac, Pardeshi & Sulakhe, 2021
C. ranganaensis Sayyed & Sulakhe, 2020 – Rangana dwarf gecko
C. regalis Pal, Mirza, Dsouza & Shanker, 2021
C. retigalensis Wickramasinghe & Munindradasa, 2007 – Retigala day gecko
C. rishivalleyensis Agarwal, Thackeray & Khandekar, 2020 – Rishi Valley dwarf gecko 
C. rubraoculus Pal, Mirza, Dsouza & Shanker, 2021
C. rudhira Agarwal, Thackeray, & Khandekar, 2022 – scarlet dwarf gecko
C. sakleshpurensis Khandekar, Thackeray, & Agarwal, 2022
C. salimalii Agarwal, Thackeray, & Khandekar, 2022 – Salim Ali’s dwarf gecko
C. samanalensis Wickramasinghe & Munindradasa, 2007 – Samanala day gecko
C. scalpensis (Ferguson, 1877) – Ferguson's day gecko
C. schalleri Agarwal, Thackeray & Khandekar, 2021 – Schaller's Sakleshpur dwarf gecko 
C. shevaroyensis Khandekar, Gaitonde & Agarwal, 2019 – Shevaroy dwarf gecko
C. silvula Manamendra-Arachchi, Batuwita & Pethiyagoda, 2007 – forest day gecko
C. sisparensis (Theobald, 1876) – Sispara day gecko or Theobald's gecko
C. smaug Pal, Mirza, Dsouza & Shanker, 2021
C. stellapulvis Khandekar, Thackeray & Agarwal, 2020 – stardust dwarf gecko 
C. tanintharyi Lee, Miller, Zug, & Mulcahy, 2019 – Tanintharyi rock gecko
C. thackerayi Khandekar, Gaitonde, & Agarwal, 2019 – Thackeray's dwarf gecko
C. thayawthadangyi Lee, Miller, Zug & Mulcahy, 2019 – Thayawthadangyi Islands rock gecko
C. tigris Khandekar, Thackeray, & Agarwal, 2022
C. tropidogaster (Boulenger, 1885) – rough-bellied day gecko or marked-belly gecko
C. umashaankeri Narayanan & Aravind, 2022
C. upendrai Manamendra-Arachchi, Batuwita & Pethiyagoda, 2007 – Upendra's day gecko
C. uttaraghati Agarwal, Thackeray & Khandekar, 2021 
C. vijayae Khandekar, Thackeray, & Agarwal, 2022
C. wallaceii Pal, Mirza, Dsouza & Shanker, 2021
C. wicksi (Stoliczka, 1873)
C. wynadensis (Beddome, 1870) – Wynad day gecko
C. yelagiriensis Agarwal, Thackeray, Pal & Khandekar, 2020 – Yelagiri dwarf gecko
C. yercaudensis Das & Bauer, 2000 – Yercaud day gecko
C. zacharyi Cyriac, Palot, Deuti & Umesh, 2020

The Sundaland group

C. aceh Iskandar, McGuire, & Amarasinghe, 2017
C. adangrawi  Ampai, Rujirawan, Wood, Stuart, & Aowphol, 2019 - Adang-Rawi rock gecko
C. affinis (Stoliczka, 1870) – Stoliczka's gecko, Pinang Island rock gecko
C. andalas  Iskandar, McGuire, & Amarasinghe, 2017
C. argus Dring, 1979 – Dring's gecko, Argus rock gecko, Lawit Mountain rock gecko
C. aurantiacopes Grismer & Ngo, 2007 – Hon Dat rock gecko
C. auriventralis Rujirawan, Yodthong, Ampai,  Termprayoon, Aksornneam, Stuart, & Aowphol, 2022 – Erawan rock gecko
C. baueri Das & Grismer 2003 – Bauer's rock gecko, Pulau Aur rock gecko
C. bayuensis Grismer, Grismer, Wood, & Chan 2008 – Kampung Bayu rock gecko, Gua Bayu rock gecko, Bayu Cave rock gecko
C. bidongensis  Grismer, Wood, Ahmad, Sumarli, Vazquez, Ismail, Nance, Mohd-amin, Othman, Rizaijessika, Kuss, Murdoc, & Cobos, 2014 – Pulau Bidong rock gecko
C. biocellata Grismer, Chan, Nurolhuda, & Sumontha 2008, – twin-spot rock gecko
C. boulengeri Strauch 1887 – Boulenger's rock gecko, Con Dao round eyed gecko
C. calderana Milto & Bezman-Moseyko, 2021
C. chanardi Grismer, Sumontha, Cota, Grismer, Wood, Pauwels, & Kunya, 2010 - Chan-ard's rock gecko
C. chanthaburiensis Bauer & Das 1998 – Chanthaburi rock gecko
C. caudanivea Grismer & Ngo, 2007 – Hon Tre Island rock gecko
C. dezwaani Das 2005
C. dringi Das & Bauer 1998 – Dring's rock gecko
C. flavigaster Chan & Grismer 2008 – orange-bellied rock gecko
C. flavolineata (Nicholls, 1949) – yellow-striped rock gecko
C. grismeri Wood, Quah, Anuar Ms, & Muin, 2013 - Grismer's rock gecko
C. hangus Grismer et al., 2014
C. harimau Chan, Grismer, Anuar, Quah, Muin, Savage, Grismer, Ahmad, Remigio, & Greer, 2010 - tiger rock gecko
C. huaseesom Grismer, Sumontha, Cota, Grismer, Wood, Pauwels, & Kunya, 2010
C. jacobsoni Das 2005
C. kamolnorranathi Grismer, Sumontha, Cota, Grismer, Wood, Pauwels, & Kunya, 2010 – Kamolnorranath's rock gecko
C. karsticola Grismer, Grismer, Wood, & Chan 2008 – karst-dwelling rock gecko
C. kendallii (Gray, 1845) – Kendall's rock gecko 
C. kumpoli Taylor 1963 – Kumpol's rock gecko, Trang Province gecko
C. lagang Nashriq, Davis, Bauer, & Das, 2022
C. laoensis Grismer, 2010 - Lao rock gecko
C. leucura Kurita, Nishikawa, Matsui, & Hikida, 2017 - curse rock gecko
C. limi Das & Grismer 2003 – Tioman Island rock gecko
C. lineatubercularis Ampai, Wood, Stuart, & Aowphol, 2020 - Lan Saka rock gecko
C. lineogularis Wood, Grismer, Aowphol, Aguilar, Cota, Grismer, Murdoch, & Sites, 2017 - stripe-throated rock gecko
C. mahsuriae Grismer, Wood, Quah, Anuar, Ngadi, & Ahmad, 2015 - Mahsuri's rock gecko
C. matahari Nashriq, Davis, Bauer, & Das, 2022
C. mcguirei Grismer, Grismer, Wood, & Chan 2008 – McGuire's rock gecko
C. mimang Iskandar, McGuire, & Amarsinghe, 2017
C. modiglianii Das 2005
C. monachorum Grismer, Ahmad, Chan, Belabut, Muin, Wood, & Grismer, 2009 - Monks's rock gecko
C. mumpuniae Grismer et al., 2014
C. muria  Riyanto, Munir, Martamenggala, Fitriana, & Hamidy, 2019
C. narathiwatensis Grismer, Sumontha, Cota, Grismer, Wood, Pauwels, & Kunya, 2010 – Narathiwat rock gecko
C. neangthyi Grismer, Grismer, & Chav, 2010 – Neang Thy's rock gecko
C. nigridia (Smith, 1925) – Borneo black gecko, black-spotted rock gecko
C. niyomwanae Grismer, Sumontha, Cota, Grismer, Wood, Pauwels, & Kunya, 2010 – Niyomwan's rock gecko,
C. nuicamensis Grismer & Ngo, 2007 – Nui Cam Hill rock gecko
C. omari Grismer et al., 2014
C. pagai Iskandar, McGuire, & Amarsinghe, 2017
C. paripari Grismer & Onn, 2009 - fairy rock gecko
C. pemanggilensis Grismer & Das 2006 – Johor, West Malaysia – Pemanggil Island rock gecko
C. peninsularis Grismer et al., 2014 – peninsular rock gecko
C. perhentianensis Grismer & Chan, 2008
C. phangngaensis Wood, Grismer, Aowphol, Aguilar, Cota, Grismer, Murdoch, & Sites, 2017 - Phang Nga rock gecko
C. phuketensis Das & Leon 2004,
C. pseudomcguirei Grismer, Ahmad, Chan, Belabut, Muin, Wood, & Grismer, 2009 - false McGuire's rock gecko 
C. psychedelica Grismer, Ngo, & Grismer, 2010 – psychedelic rock gecko
C. punctatonuchalis Grismer, Sumontha, Cota, Grismer, Wood, Pauwels, & Kunya, 2010 – spotted-neck rock gecko
C. purnamai Riyanto, Hamidy, Sidik, & Gunalen, 2017
C. rajabasa Amarasinghe, Harvey, Riyanto, & Smith, 2015
C. roticanai Grismer & Onn, 2010 – Roti Canai rock gecko
C. samui Ampai, Rujirawan, Yodthong, Termprayoon, Stuart, Wood, & Aowphol, 2022
C. selamatkanmerapoh Grismer, Wood, Mohamed, Chan, Heinz, Sumarli, Chan & Loredo, 2013 - Merapoh rock gecko
C. selenolagus Grismer, Yushchenko, Pawangkhanant, Nazarov, Naiduangchan, Suwannapoom & Poyarkov, 2020 - Moon Rabbit Rock Gecko
C. shahruli Grismer, Chan, Quah, Muin, Savage, Grismer, Ahmad, Greer, & Remegio, 2010 - Shahrul's rock gecko
C. siamensis (Smith, 1925) – Siamese rock gecko
C. similan Ampai, Rujirawan, Yodthong, Termprayoon, Stuart, Wood, & Aowphol, 2022
C. sirehensis Nashriq, Davis, Bauer, & Das, 2022
C. stongensis Grismer et al., 2014
C. sundagekko Grismer et al., 2014
C. sundainsula Grismer et al., 2014
C. tapanuli Iskandar, McGuire, & Amarsinghe, 2017
C. tarutaoensis  Ampai, Rujirawan, Wood, Stuart, & Aowphol, 2019 - Tarutao rock gecko
C. temiah Grismer et al., 2014
C. thachanaensis Wood, Grismer, Aowphol, Aguilar, Cota, Grismer, Murdoch, & Sites, 2017
 C. tubaensis Quah, Wood, Anuar, & Muin, 2020 – Tuba Island rock gecko
C. tucdupensis Grismer & Ngo, 2007 – Tuc Dup Hill rock gecko
C. timoriensis Duméril & Bibron 1836, 
C. vandeventeri Grismer, Sumontha, Cota, Grismer, Wood, Pauwels, & Kunya, 2010 – VanDeventer's rock gecko
C. whittenorum Das 2005

References

 
Reptiles of Pakistan
Reptiles of Thailand
Lizards of Asia
Lizard genera
Taxa named by Alexander Strauch